SS Koning der Nederlanden was a Dutch ocean liner of the Netherland Line. She served from 1872 until her sinking in 1881 in the Indian Ocean while en route from Batavia to Amsterdam. Three of her lifeboats, with a total of 90 passengers and crew, were never found.

The 3063-ton steamship Koning der Nederlanden was built in Scotland at the John Elder & Company shipyard in Govan. The ship was launched on September 5, 1872 and proceeded on her maiden voyage.

SS Koning der Nederlanden (King of the Netherlands) helped move passengers, freight and mail between Amsterdam and the Dutch East Indies. She was built for the Netherlands Steamship Company. The company's ships maintained regular passenger and freight traffic between the Netherlands and the Dutch East Indies. They had a trademark chimney design, with a black band on top of a yellow-brown funnel.

On Tuesday 4 October 1881, the ship's drive shaft broke in the middle of the Indian Ocean, while on the way from Batavia to Amsterdam, allowing water into the vessel. Upon the sea water flooding the engine room, Captain Bruyns ordered an evacuation of the ship. All 216 passengers and crew members left the ship. The ship began to sink slowly, and sank by the stern on the following day, 5 October. Of the six lifeboats launched from the steamship, three were found and rescued, but the remaining three boats, with a total of 90 passengers and crew, disappeared without trace.

At that time screw propulsion was already recognized as more efficient than paddle propulsion, but the construction of long drive shafts that were strong and yet flexible was still problematic.

References

External links 
 Technical and historical data of the Koning der Nederlanden archived 6 Oct 2011 from Original
 ship data in the Clyde Built Ships Database archived 24 Sep 2006 from Original

1872 ships
Ships built in Govan
Passenger ships
Shipwrecks in the Indian Ocean
Maritime incidents in October 1881